The Sungai Johor Bridge (Jawi: جمبتن سوڠاي جوهر) is an expressway bridge across Johor River on Senai–Desaru Expressway in Johor, Malaysia. The 1.7 km (1,708 m) single plane cable stayed bridge connects Pulau Juling in Johor Bahru District in the west to Tanjung Penyabong in Kota Tinggi District in the east. Opened on 10 June 2011, it has the longest central span of any river bridge in Malaysia, followed by Batang Sadong Bridge in Sarawak. The bridge is also the longest single plane cable-stayed bridge in Malaysia.

History
Construction officially began in 2005. Construction was led by Senai Desaru Expressway Berhad with a main contractor Ranhill Engineers & Constructors Sdn Bhd. The bridge was to have been completed by December 2008, but opening of the bridge was repeatedly delayed, opening together with the 2nd phase of the expressway on 10 June 2011.

Specifications
The bridge is 1,708 metres (1.7 km) long, with a 500-metre (0.5 km) main span across the Johor River. The two main pylons of the bridge rise to a height of 143 meters.

The expressway on the bridge has two lanes on each direction, without any shoulder.

Gallery

See also
 List of longest cable-stayed bridge spans

References

External links

 Senai-Desaru Expressway Berhad (SDEB) 
 Longest cable-stayed bridge planned (The Star, 18 December 2006)

2011 establishments in Malaysia
Bridges completed in 2011
Bridges in Johor
Cable-stayed bridges in Malaysia
Senai–Desaru Expressway